WLNH-FM (98.3 MHz) — branded as Frank FM — is a radio station located in Laconia, New Hampshire, United States.  The station broadcasts to the Lakes Region and Concord, New Hampshire.  The format is classic hits music, and on air it is identified as "New Hampshire's Greatest Hits".  WLNH-FM is owned by Binnie Media.

WLNH is known for its statewide competition, New Hampshire Idol.  A smaller version of the highly successful American Idol, NH Idol is a singing competition for residents in New Hampshire aged 16 – 30. The 2006 winner was Jacob Heal, who won the grand prize of having a demo CD produced by Jimmy Landry who is an A&R consultant and In-house Producer for Virgin Records.

Every December, the WLNH Children's Auction, a nationally registered 501(c)(3) organization, organizes the long-standing WLNH Children's Auction.  WLNH is a major contributor to the WLNH Children's Auction.  In 2005, WLNH was able to raise $181,000 for the local community. Over the last 25 years, WLNH has brought in over $1 million for the community.  The WLNH Children's Auction relies heavily on the community and local organizations for help. Contributors generously gave over 2,300 items in 2005.

WLNH-FM, along with 16 other stations in northern New England formerly owned by Nassau Broadcasting Partners, was purchased at bankruptcy auction by WBIN Media Company, a company controlled by Bill Binnie, on May 22, 2012.  Binnie already owned WBIN-TV in Derry and WYCN-LP in Nashua.  The deal was completed on November 30, 2012.

On May 24, 2019, WLNH-FM changed its format from adult contemporary to classic hits, branded as "Frank FM"; the programming is largely simulcast with Nashua sister station WFNQ, though WLNH breaks away for local commercials and IDs. The "Frank FM" network, which also includes WBYY in Somersworth, transitioned to a hot adult contemporary format during 2021.

After morning host Marc Nazzaro (who used the air name "DJ Nazzy") was laid off from "Frank FM" in January 2023 as part of a refocus of Binnie Media's resources on its news and talk programming, vice president of programming Heath Cole told the Concord Monitor that "the music format that we do will change." On February 1, 2023, WLNH-FM, along with the rest of the "Frank FM" network, returned to a classic hits format; the stations also dropped their remaining on-air staff, who were reassigned to other positions within the company.

References

External links

LNH-FM
Classic hits radio stations in the United States
Radio stations established in 1965
1965 establishments in New Hampshire